The 2011 Lebanese protests, also known as the Intifada of Dignity or Uprising of Dignity were seen as influenced by the Arab Spring. The main protests focused on calls for political reform especially against confessionalism in Lebanon. The protests initiated in early 2011, and dimmed by the end of the year. In another aspect of the Arab Spring, Lebanese pro and anti-Assad factions descended into sectarian violence, which culminated in May–June 2012.

Background

Political system 
Lebanon is a parliamentary republic within the overall framework of confessionalism, a form of consociationalism in which the highest offices are proportionately reserved for representatives from certain religious communities. The constitution grants the people the right to change their government, however, from the mid-1970s until the parliamentary elections in 1992, a civil war precluded the exercise of political rights. According to the constitution, direct elections must be held for the parliament every 4 years. The last parliamentary election was in 2018,. The parliament, in turn, elects a president every 6 years to a single term, he is, however, not eligible for re-election. The last presidential election was in 2016. The president and parliament choose the prime minister. Political parties are grouped with either the March 8 alliance or the March 14 alliance. (the Progressive Socialist Party of Walid Jumblatt is ostensibly independent but strongly leans towards March 14 even after their withdrawal from the March 14 alliance due to political views towards Syria and Iran).

Lebanon demographics is roughly split amongst Sunnis, Shias and Christians (most of whom are Maronite). Due to the demographic concerns, amid fears the country could be a powder keg, a census has not been carried out since 1932. Since then the government has only published rough estimates of the population.

2011 new government 

On 12 January 2011, the government collapsed after Energy Minister Gebran Bassil announced that all ten opposition ministers had resigned following months of warnings by Hezbollah that it would not remain inactive should there be indictments against the group by the Special Tribunal for Lebanon in the assassination of former Prime Minister Rafic Hariri. Preliminary indictments were issued 17 January as expected,) President Michel Suleiman's appointed Minister of State, Adnan Sayyed Hussein, resigned later bringing the total number of ministers who quit to 11 thus causing the fall of the government. The New York Times suggested that the resignations came after the collapse of talks between Syria and Saudi Arabia to ease tensions in Lebanon. The resignations stemmed from PM Hariri's refusal to call an emergency cabinet session over discussion for withdrawing cooperation with the STL.

Suleiman, who is constitutionally responsible for the formation of a new government, accepted the resignations saying: "In line with clause one of article 69 in the Lebanese constitution on the circumstances under which the government is considered to have resigned...as the government has lost more than one third of its members...the cabinet [is requested to] act as a caretaker government until the formation of a new government." The March 8 alliance then nominate Najib Mikati to form a government in line with the accepted norms that a prime minister must be a Sunni (even though most Sunnis are supporters of March 14).

On 13 June, a new government was formed.

Protests

27 February 

On 27 February, hundreds of Lebanese marched along the old demarcation line in the capital Beirut against the country's sectarian political system. A peaceful sit-in in Saida also took place.

6 March
In follow-up rallies to the 27 February demonstration, around 8,000 people marched from Dora to Beirut in the second round of a campaign to "topple the sectarian regime" and its leading symbols and to call for a secular state. Similar protests took place in Baalbek and Sidon.

13 March
A rally was organised by the March 14 alliance in which several hundreds of thousands supporters attended in commemoration of the start Cedar Revolution 6 years earlier. The main slogan of the rally was calling for the disarmament of Hezbollah and to renew support for the ideals of the revolution.

20 March
Thousands of Lebanese took to the streets to protest against the sectarian nature of the governing system. This was the third protest against the sectarian political system.

17 June
In interfactional clashes in Tripoli, Seven people were killed and 59 were wounded, on Friday, 17 June. Armed clashes erupted in following a rally in support of Syrian protesters. Fighting broke out between gunmen positioned in the rival neighborhoods of Jabal Mohsen (mainly Alawites who support the Syrian government) and Bab al-Tabbaneh (mainly Sunnis, supporting the Syrian uprising). Among the dead were a Lebanese army soldier and an official from the Alawite Arab Democratic Party.

26 June 
On 26 June, hundreds of people marched towards the parliament in Beirut demanding the end of Lebanon's confessional system.

12 October
What the local press considered might be the largest general strike in its history had been called for this date. The General Labor Confederation is demanding higher wages, among other things. The cabinet acceded to these demands, and the marches were "suspended. However, the teacher's union refused to accept this, went on strike anyway, and paralyzed the nation's education system

15 December 
5,000 protesters filled the streets of Downtown Beirut as part of a teacher's strike, which is said to be a precursor of a general strike planned for the following week.

Aftermath and spillover from Syria (2011-12)

On 5 and 6 October 2011, the Syrian army briefly invaded (killing one person) before retreating again across the border, causing instability in the Mikati government. "I am not being silent about this, we are dealing with the issue normally", Mikati said, noting the permeability of the border.

Further incursions by the Syrian military onto Lebanese territory occurred in December 2011, resulting in more deaths. More Syrian incursions into Lebanon (also to Turkey) followed in March 2012. In addition to the Tripoli clashes in March between Alawites and Sunnis, several border penetrations increased fears of Syrian uprising affecting Lebanon. The clashes greatly escalated in May and June, leaving dozens dead and hundreds wounded.

See also

 List of modern conflicts in the Middle East
Cedar Revolution
2006–08 Lebanese protests
2015 Lebanese protests

References

External links 
 Down with the Sectarian Regime 

Lebanon
2011 in Lebanon
Lebanon
Politics of Lebanon
Protests in Lebanon
Secularism in Lebanon
Lebanese